East Branch Mohawk River may refer to the following rivers:

 East Branch Mohawk River (New Hampshire), in New Hampshire
 East Branch Mohawk River (New York), in New York